Thunder Glacier is located on the northeast slopes of Buckner Mountain, North Cascades National Park in the U.S. state of Washington.

See also
 List of glaciers in the United States

References

Glaciers of the North Cascades
Glaciers of Skagit County, Washington
Glaciers of Washington (state)